The 2017 Clarkson Cup was a women's ice hockey championship that was contested for the second straight year at Canadian Tire Centre in Ottawa, Ontario, to determine the champion of the Canadian Women's Hockey League. Held on March 5, 2017, the Calgary Inferno competed against the Canadiennes de Montreal, a rematch of the 2016 Clarkson Cup finals. This marked the first time that the same two teams skated in consecutive Clarkson Cup finals.

Game summary

Canadiennes de Montreal – 2017 Clarkson Cup champions

Defenders
5 Lauriane Rougeau
6 Carly Hill
8 Cathy Chartrand (Assistant Captain) 
14 Brittany Fouracres 
17 Melanie Desrochers 
21 Julie Chu
23 Sophie Brault
51 Cassandra Poudrier 

Forwards
9 Kim Deschenes
10 Noemie Marin
11 Alyssa Sherrard 
13 Caroline Ouellette (Assistant Captain)
16 Sarah Lefort
19 Katia Clement-Heydra  
20 Jordanna Peroff
24 Ann-Sophie Bettez
29 Marie-Philip Poulin (Captain) 
39 Marion Allemoz 
47 Emmanuelle Blais
62 Emilie Bocchia
71 Leslie Oles
76 Karell Emard

Goaltenders
31 Catherine Herron  
32 Charline Labonte 

Coaching and Administrative Staff
Dany Brunet  (Head coach)
 Marc Beaudoin, Assistant coach
Lisa-Marie Breton-Lebreux (Assistant coach)
Kelly Sudia, Technical coach
 Gilles Charron, Goalie coach
Jenny Lavigne, Assistant goalie coach
Steve Lortie, Video coach

Awards and honors
Playoff MVP: Charline Labonte
First Star of the Game: Charline Labonte
Second Star of the Game: Marie-Philip Poulin
Third Star of the Game: Jillian Saulnier

References

2017
2016–17 in women's ice hockey
Ice hockey in Ottawa